The Masyumi Party or generally known as the Masyumi Reborn Party is an Islamist political party founded in Indonesia on November 7, 2020. The party was founded by Ahmad Yani, leader of the Action for Rescuing Indonesia Coalition. While the party claimed to be a spiritual successor of the original Masyumi Party which was disbanded in 1960 due to its involvement in PRRI rebellion, the party has a much stronger Islamic fundamentalist basis, due to being powered by Indonesian Islamist activists from 212 Movement "alumni".

History 
On September 7, 2019, the Investigating Committee for Foundation of Islamic Ideological Parties/Preparatory Committee for Foundation of Islamic Ideological Parties (BPU-PPPII/P4II) was founded by various Indonesian Islamist reactionary groups. The group claimed to revive the legendary Masyumi Party which was disbanded in 1960 due to their involvement with the PRRI rebellion and tried to revive the party with name "Masyumi 1945". However, in the middle of the process, elements of the Action for Rescuing Indonesia Coalition entered the group and unilaterally hijacked the process. This lead into a breakdown of the preparatory group and led into the formation of the Masyumi Reborn Party. A number of faithful members of the preparatory group later founded the Indonesian People's Da'wah Party.

Ideological and political stances 
The Masyumi Reborn Party adheres to an Islamist agenda.

The party has been influenced by strong Islamism and anti-capitalism. The party openly forbade their cadres to express happiness, even only clapping and expressing gratitude or congratulations, claiming that those acts "resemble Jewish" practices and must avoiding conventional banking or taking/getting financial interests from them, seeing them as a form of usury.

The party also advocates jihadism, but not terrorism and further denounces the misuse of Jihad in committing terrorism. However, the party claimed that Indonesian terrorist acts all possibly are set-up, "highly political in nature", and "looks like an attempt to weaken the opposition", showing the party siding to an Islamic right-wing populist narrative. The party advocates for the repeal of Omnibus Law on Job Creation, agrarian reform, social equity, and other advocations similar to left-wing groups in Indonesia. Such syncretization has confused Indonesian political experts on how to eventually classify the alignment of the party.

The party advocates implementation of sharia as the basis of law in Indonesia.

Receptions 
The party formation was congratulated by a like-minded party in the People's Representative Council, the Prosperous Justice Party. The party hoped that Masyumi Reborn will power the opposition to Joko Widodo and sought a way to ally with them.

The centrist Islamist parties such as United Development Party, Crescent Star Party, National Mandate Party, and National Awakening Party underestimate the party electability, due to its "extreme" ideologies and very narrow electors segmentation.

Secular parties like Golkar and PDI-P also congratulated the party formation. The Golkar party also advised that the party must move on and not "rest in past laurels" of old days and must innovate to gain popular support, not use a religious narrative and religious populism for party gain.

Political scientists raised warning in the appearance of Masyumi Reborn due to the party ideology not following the official state ideology of Pancasila and the party's straight use of Islamism. Adi Prayitno, a political scientist from UIN Syarif Hidayatullah, warned that the party not adhering to the Pancasila state ideology at least in part will cause a clash with Indonesian nationalist parties and groups. Aidil Haris of the Muhammadiyah University of Riau said that the party must focus on specific issues.

References 

2020 establishments in Indonesia
Political parties established in 2020
Far-right politics in Asia
Islamism in Indonesia
Pan-Islamism
Right-wing anti-capitalism
Right-wing antisemitism